Cup'ik, also spelled Cupik, typically refers to the Central Alaskan Yup'ik people. The plural form is Cup'it.

Other uses include:

People
 Cupik people
 Calista Corporation, an Alaskan regional corporation with largely Central Alaskan Yup'ik people as members

Languages
 Central Alaskan Yup'ik language
 Chevak Cup’ik language or Hooper Bay-Chevak Cup'ik
 Nunivak Cup'ig language

See also
 Alaska Natives
 List of Alaska Native tribal entities
 Siberian Yupik